The following lists events that happened during 1974 in Cambodia.

Incumbents 
 Monarch: Lon Nol 
 Prime Minister: Long Boret

Events

January

February

March

April

May

June

July

August

September

October

November

December

See also
List of Cambodian films of 1974

References

 
1970s in Cambodia
Years of the 20th century in Cambodia
Cambodia
Cambodia